Gnesin, or Gnessin is a Jewish Russian surname:
 Fabian Osipovich Gnesin (1837–1891), an official rabbi of Rostov-on-Don and father of a prominent Jewish Russian family of musicians and philanthropists.
 Sisters Gnesin:
 Yevgeniya Savina-Gnesina (1870–1940)
 Elena Gnesina (1874–1967)
 Maria Gnesina (1876–1918)
 Yelizaveta Gnesina-Vitáček (1876–1953)
 Olga Alexandrova-Gnesina (1881–1963)
 Mikhail Gnesin (1883–1957), Jewish Russian composer
 Grigory Gnesin (1884–1938), singer and stage actor
 Gnesin State Musical College, Moscow
 Uri Nissan Gnessin (1879–1913), Jewish Russian writer, a pioneer in modern Hebrew literature
 Menahem Gnessin (1882–1951), Jewish Russian stage actor, younger brother of Uri Nissan Gnessin

References 

Jewish surnames
Russian-language surnames
Surnames of Polish origin
Matronymic surnames